Flower Crew is a South Korean travel-reality show that was formerly broadcast via SBS on Mondays at 23:10 (KST) from September 5 to November 21, 2016. Starting November 27, 2016, it aired every Sunday at 16:50 (KST), before Running Man, forming part of SBS's Good Sunday lineup and ended with its last episode on March 19, 2017.

Flower Crew was first broadcast through the Naver V App as a pilot episode. The regular show starred Seo Jang-hoon, Jo Se-ho, Ahn Jung-hwan, Yoo Byung-jae, Winner's Kang Seung-yoon and Lee Sung-jae. Flower Crew took the cast members on a three-day adventure in which all their decisions were made by viewers of the show. Viewers had the chance to participate in the show through Naver V live broadcast voting.

YG Entertainment decided to partner with broadcasting station SBS to begin airing the new show regularly. From episode 1 of the variety show, the show no longer included Jungkook and Kim Min-seok because of their hectic schedules. To replace them, the producers picked Sechs Kies's Lee Jaijin and Eun Jiwon. Eun Jiwon has been in other variety shows such as New Journey to the West and 2 Days & 1 Night.

Format 

As of Episode 1, basically, all members will gathered and will create an activity to determine the Team Flowery Road and Team Muddy Road, followed by picking Golden Transfer Ticket , which is shaped like a golden coin with hole in the middle as written "Flowery Road", same as "Silver Transfer Ticket".

Usually a Guest(s) only participated on the second day for a while to do activities with the members, and sometimes invited at the beginning of trip as Leader  of Team Flowery Road for early trip and will participated with members until the end of the trip.

Team Flowery Road will enjoy the luxury and pleasure and comfort during trip, including accommodation, vehicles, food, and the best service provided by the crew. Different about the fate of Team Muddy Road, which will go through the hardship and discomfort as beds in dilapidated houses, lack of food and activities are less enjoyable.

After a situation of havoc created unintentionally by Lee Jaijin, in one of the latter episodes, the production team created a rule stating that the Transfer Ticket only can be used & only available in same day the Flower Crew members receive or get it from the lucky draw or the guest. It only can be used before midnight at any situation, for anyone & any place.

Transfer Ticket 

As in early episode, there are several types of Transfer Ticket in this show as almost every new episode or trip, the staff production keep introduces a new kind of Transfer Ticket to the Flower Crew Member.

The most common one and as the powerful transfer ticket, Golden aka "Exchange", function as the user can swap or trade House Road with the other member from other house road. The user can switch place from Muddy road to Flower Road and must summon someone from other house to replace the user.

The second and the famous one, Silver aka "Transfer", function as the user can transfer someone from both House Road to the other house road but he/she cannot use it to him/herself.

Theme 

As of pilot episode, Flower Crew consists of 2 theme, Flower Road & Muddy Road. The symbol for Flower Road is Gomusin, are shoes made of rubber in a form of Korean traditional shoes. And Jipsin is the symbol for Muddy Road, are Korean traditional sandals made of straw.

Cast member 

The original Line-up for Flower Crew consist of 6 members. The original members of Flower Crew were Seo Jang-hoon, Ahn Jung-hwan, Jo Se-ho, Yoo Byung-jae and Kim Min-seok. Kim Min-seok and Jungkook left the show because of their hectic schedules and their position were replaced by Sechs Kies member, Eun Jiwon & Lee Jaijin from episode 1 that was broadcast on SBS Channel.

On the 4th Trip (Episode 12), Sechs Kies members Eun Jiwon & Lee Jaijin made last appearance and  left the show for concentrating on group promotions & their spots was filled by the previous guest, WINNER's Kang Seung-yoon to be the 5th member of Flower Crew and latter episode, actor Lee Sung Jae had invited to be the 6th member of Flower Crew.

Guest

Ratings

2016

2017

Awards and nominations

References

External links

2010s South Korean television series
South Korean travel television series
South Korean variety television shows
Mass media in Korea
Travel web series
2016 South Korean television series debuts
2017 South Korean television series endings
2016 web series debuts
Korean-language television shows
Television series by YG Entertainment